François Raguenet (c. 1660 in Rouen – 1722) was a French historian, biographer and musicologist.

Biography 
Raguenet embraced the ecclesiastical state, and became preceptor of Marie Anne Mancini, cardinal de Bouillon's niece. This position, leaving him the leisure to cultivate his taste for letters, he distinguished himself in the competitions of the Académie française and obtained, in 1685, an accessit by a discourse on the subject,  ("On patience and the vice that is contrary to it"). Two years later, he won the prize in a speech entitled  ("On the merit and use of martyrdom").

In 1698, abbott Raguenet followed Cardinal de Bouillon at Rome and for two years studied the masterpieces of the arts which decorate the palaces and churches of the capital of the Christian world. The description he gave of it, shortly after his return to Paris, earned him the "letters from the Roman citizen", a title which flattered him greatly, and which he afterwards added to his name.

During his stay in Rome, he became passionate about Italian music. He undertook to demonstrate its superiority over music by the likes of Lully and Campra. His writings on musical life in Italy sparked a quarrel between French and Italian music, notably with his compatriot Jean-Laurent Le Cerf de La Viéville, who strongly criticized this work. There was then a war as terrible as that excited later by the first appearance of Opera buffas, or the rivalry between Gluck and Piccinni.

Abbott Raguenet had the good sense to go away from the storm. He left Paris at the end of his life and died in the retreat he had chosen. He wrote a biography of vicomte de Turenne by the order and before the eyes of Cardinal de Bouillon, who had taught him several interesting peculiarities.

Works 
 , Paris, 1738, 2 vol. in-12.
 , Paris, Barbin, 1691, in-4°.
 , Paris, Barbin, 1702, in-12.
 , 1705.
 , Paris, Barbin, 1708, in-8°.
 .
 . 
 , Paris, Barbin, 1700, in-12; Amsterdam, 1701, in-12.

References

Sources

External links 

17th-century French writers
17th-century French male writers
18th-century French writers
18th-century French male writers
18th-century French musicologists
French biographers
French art historians
Writers from Rouen
1660s births
1722 deaths